Bhagwantrao Annabhau Mandloi (15 December 1892 - 3 November 1977), an Indian National Congress politician was a former Chief Minister of Madhya Pradesh. He was born in Khandwa. He was a recipient of the civilian honour of Padma Bhushan.

He was twice the chief minister of the state from 1 January 1957 to 30 January 1957 and 12 March 1962 to 29 September 1963. He represented Khandwa Vidhan Sabha constituency of undivided Madhya Pradesh Legislative Assembly by winning General election of 1957.

References

External links
States of India since 1947

1892 births
1977 deaths
Indian National Congress politicians
People from Madhya Pradesh
People from Khandwa
Chief Ministers of Madhya Pradesh
Members of the Constituent Assembly of India
Madhya Pradesh MLAs 1952–1957
Madhya Pradesh MLAs 1957–1962
Madhya Pradesh MLAs 1962–1967
Recipients of the Padma Bhushan in public affairs
Chief ministers from Indian National Congress
Prisoners and detainees of British India
Indian National Congress politicians from Madhya Pradesh